Ascorhis is a genus of gastropods belonging to the family Tateidae.

The species of this genus are found in Australia.

Species:

Ascorhis occidua 
Ascorhis tasmanica

References

Tateidae